The National Guard's 22nd Cavalry Division was created from the perceived need for additional cavalry units.  It numbered in succession after the Regular Army Divisions, which were not all active at its creation.  Going into World War II, the US Army Cavalry contained 3 Regular, 4 National Guard, and 6 Organized Reserve cavalry divisions as well as 1 independent cavalry brigade (the 56th from Texas).

Organization, 1940

Two asterisks indicated the unit was allotted, but unorganized or inactive, with the state of headquarters allocation shown.

 Headquarters (Harrisburg, Pennsylvania)
 Headquarters, Special Troops (Harrisburg, Pennsylvania)
 Headquarters Troop (Bloomsburg, Pennsylvania)
 22nd Signal Troop (Philadelphia, Pennsylvania)
 126th Ordnance Company (Medium) (Ohio National Guard) **
 22nd Tank Company (Light) (Ohio National Guard) **
 52nd Cavalry Brigade
 Headquarters (Harrisburg, Pennsylvania)
 Headquarters Troop (Philadelphia, Pennsylvania)
 103rd Cavalry Regiment (United States) (Tyrone, Pennsylvania)
 104th Cavalry Regiment (United States) (Harrisburg, Pennsylvania)
 54th Cavalry Brigade
 Headquarters (Cleveland, Ohio)
 Headquarters Troop (Akron, Ohio)
 107th Cavalry Regiment (United States) (Ohio National Guard) 
 123rd Cavalry Regiment (Louisville, Kentucky)
 22nd Reconnaissance Squadron (Cincinnati, Ohio)
 166th Field Artillery Regiment (Harrisburg, Pennsylvania)
 126th Engineer Squadron (Kentucky National Guard) ** 
 122nd Medical Squadron (Pennsylvania National Guard) **
 122nd Quartermaster Squadron (Harrisburg, Pennsylvania)

Stationing
The 22nd Cavalry Division was geographically dispersed across the United States, at various times composed of personnel from the Georgia, Illinois, Indiana, Kentucky, Louisiana, Michigan, Ohio, West Virginia, and Wisconsin National Guards.

See also
 Formations of the United States Army
 List of armored and cavalry regiments of the United States Army
 United States Army branch insignia

References
 U.S. Army Order of Battle 1919–1941, Volume 2. The Arms: Cavalry, Field Artillery, and Coast Artillery, 1919–41 by Lieutenant Colonel (Retired) Steven E. Clay, Combat Studies Institute Press, Fort Leavenworth, KS, 2011
 Maneuver and Firepower, The Evolution of Divisions and Separate Brigades, by John B. Wilson, Center of Military History, Washington D.C., 1998
 Cavalry Regiments of the U S Army by James A. Sawicki Wyvern Pubns; June 1985
'', The Trading Post, Journal of the American Society of Military Insignia Collectors, April- June 2009, pages 20 & 21

External links

22